Lillian Hurst (born August 13, 1943) is a Puerto Rican actress and comedian, She made her debut as a television comedian in the early-1960s. She has worked in film, stage and television productions in the United States.

Early life
Hurst was born in the Villa Palmeras neighborhood of San Juan, Puerto Rico. Her father owned the "Farmacia Imperial" ("Imperial Pharmacy"), located in Barrio Obrero, Santurce. She received her primary and secondary education in San Juan, the capital. At an early age, she informed her parents that she wanted to be an actress. They soon enrolled her in Ana Santisteban's modeling academy. In 1960, when she was 17 years old, she was discovered by producer Gaspar Pumarejo.

Career
In 1960, Hurst was contracted and she starred in the television comedy Pompilia y su Familia (Pompilia and her Family), which was broadcast on WAPA-TV. Later, she hosted La Hora del Niño (The Children's Hour) on Channel 6.

Some of the other comedies in which she participated in the 1960s were Casos y Cosas de la Casa (Cases and Things of the House) with actor Braulio Castillo and Matrimonio y Algo Más (Marriage and Something More). In 1969, Hurst was contracted by Panamericana de Television of Lima, Peru to work in the program El Hit del Momento (The Hit of the Moment), for one year.

When Hurst returned to Puerto Rico, she went to work in some of the programs produced by her cousin, Tommy Muñiz. She also participated in various theater productions for the first time. Among them were La Casa de las Hojas Azules (The House with the Blue Leaves) and La Verdadera Historia de Pedro Navaja (The True Story of Pedro Navaja). In 1980, Hurst wrote and produced a stage show which she presented at the Condado Beach Hotel in San Juan.

Career in the United States 
Hurst went to New York City where she worked for a short time on some Off-Broadway productions. In 1989, she moved to Los Angeles, California. She also enrolled at Santa Monica College and majored in psychology. Hurst was able to work in both Spanish and English language productions. She landed a role as "Mrs. Maris" in Windows (1991), which was presented at the Taper Forum Theater, and as "Lola" in La Balada de Tina Juarez (The Ballad of Tina Juarez; 1992). She founded an acting school for Hispanic children.

Later years 
Hurst has participated in twenty movies, including the 2005 film English as a Second Language. She has also made over thirty television guest appearances in programs such as JAG, NYPD Blue, The King of Queens, The X-Files, ER, Lost, True Blood and a recurring role in Dharma & Greg, where she played the role of "Celia" in sixteen episodes. She also appeared in the Ugly Betty episode "A Tree Grows in Guadalajara" as Yolanda Salazar, the grandmother of Betty Suarez. In 2009, she appeared on Nip/Tuck as Liz Cruz's mother, Mariela.

In 2016, she returned to Los Angeles and appeared in The Comeback and Fear the Walking Dead.

Filmography

Film

Television

See also 

 List of Puerto Ricans

References

External links

1943 births
Living people
People from San Juan, Puerto Rico
Puerto Rican television actresses
Puerto Rican comedians
Actresses from San Juan, Puerto Rico